James McTeigue (born December 29, 1967) is an Australian film and television director. He has been an assistant director on many films, including Dark City (1998), the Matrix trilogy (1999–2003) and Star Wars: Episode II – Attack of the Clones (2002), and made his directorial debut with the 2005 film V for Vendetta to critical acclaim. Since Vendetta he has collaborated with the Wachowskis an additional four times as director on The Invasion (albeit uncredited), Ninja Assassin and Sense8 and as producer of The Matrix Resurrections.

Career 
He first became involved in the film industry in the late 1980s, acting as production runner or production assistant in a number of small Australian films. In 1991 his role became assistant director, being the third assistant director in another Australian film, The Girl Who Came Late.

In 1994 he was the second assistant director in Country Life, a film adaptation based on Michael Blakemore's National Theatre production of Uncle Vanya, which had a much wider audience than his previous affairs. He also acted again as second assistant director in a small Australian television film.

McTeigue broke into mainstream Hollywood in 1994 as the second assistant director for No Escape and the big budget film Street Fighter. In 1996 McTeigue again acted as second assistant director on an American television film and a small Australian film being completed that year.

In 1997 he was the second assistant director for the WWII film Paradise Road as well as The Well, that year he also worked as first assistant director for the television series Big Sky. The following year he was the second assistant director for the American science-fiction film Dark City as well as the Australian film The Sugar Factory.

In 1999 McTeigue was intended to act as second assistant director for The Matrix film until the first assistant director, a friend of McTeigue who told him about the project, had to drop out and The Wachowskis made McTeigue first assistant director. The film was released in 1999 and became a huge success.

The following year he acted as first assistant director on the popular Australian film Looking for Alibrandi as well as The Monkey's Mask.

In 2000 McTeigue worked with George Lucas and became the first assistant director for Star Wars: Episode II – Attack of the Clones, which was released in 2002. Following this, he was also the first assistant director for both Matrix sequels The Matrix Reloaded and The Matrix Revolutions.

In 2005 McTeigue made his directorial debut with V for Vendetta, written and produced by the Wachowskis. After spending so much time on The Matrix film series, they gave the opportunity to McTeigue to direct, first showing him a copy of the Vendetta graphic novel during post-production of The Matrix Revolutions.

Warner Bros. expressed dissatisfaction with the way Oliver Hirschbiegel's The Invasion shaped up and brought in James McTeigue for an additional 17 days of filming based on rewrites by the Wachowskis. The film was released in 2007 with the involvement of McTeigue and the Wachowskis being uncredited.

In 2008 he did second unit directing work on the Wachowskis' Speed Racer.

McTeigue directed Ninja Assassin, produced by the Wachowskis, which was out in 2009. The same year he was said to be directing a reboot of the Superman film series, a rumor that he neither confirmed nor denied, but Warner Bros. ultimately gave the job of rebooting the Superman franchise to Zack Snyder.

In 2012, he directed the thriller The Raven, a fictionalized account of the last days of Edgar Allan Poe's life, in which the poet and author pursues a serial killer whose murders mirror those in Poe's stories.

He partnered again with the Wachowskis to direct the Mexico City, Mumbai and parts of the Reykjavik units on their Netflix science fiction drama Sense8 which debuted in 2015. McTeigue got directing credit in two episodes.

Over the years McTeigue has been linked as director of the films Osiris Release, Richard K. Morgan's Altered Carbon, Message from The King, Bloodsport and Alien Sleeper Cell but as of May 2016 none of them have moved forward.

In 2021, McTeigue continued his ongoing creative collaboration with Lana Wachowski and was producer of The Matrix Resurrections.

Filmography
Feature films
V for Vendetta (2005)
Ninja Assassin (2009)
The Raven (2012)
Survivor (2015)
Breaking In (2018)

Short films
Caserta Palace Dream (2014)

Television series
Sense8 (2015)
Marco Polo - Season 2 (2016)
Messiah (2020)

References

External links 
 
 Interview with McTeigue and Joel Silver

Australian film directors
Living people
People from Tauranga
1967 births
Charles Sturt University alumni
People from the North Shore, Sydney
English-language film directors